Robert, Bob or Bobby Hooper may refer to:

J. Robert Hooper (1936–2008), member of the Maryland Senate
Robert Hooper (swimmer) (born 1918), Canadian freestyle swimmer
Robert Hooper (physician) (1773–1835), English physician and medical writer
Bob Hooper (1922–1980), Canadian-born pitcher in Major League Baseball
Bobby Hooper (basketball) (born 1946), American basketball player
Robert Lettis Hooper (died 1738/39), chief justice of the New Jersey Supreme Court
Robert William Hooper (1810–1885), Boston physician
Robert Lettis Hooper Jr. (1730s–1797), American Revolutionary War soldier and New Jersey politician